Houdini & Doyle is a British television drama series loosely based on the real-world friendship of Harry Houdini and Sir Arthur Conan Doyle. A 10-episode first season was ordered by Fox in the United States, ITV in the United Kingdom, and Global in Canada. The pilot episode was written by co-creators David Hoselton and David Titcher. The first episode was broadcast simultaneously on ITV and ITV Encore on Sunday 13 March 2016.

On August 3, 2016, Fox cancelled the series after one season.

Premise
Harry Houdini is a cynical skeptic and atheist whereas Dr. Arthur Conan Doyle is a believer in the paranormal and supernatural. The drama opens in 1901 London, shortly after the publication of Doyle's The Great Boer War. Houdini and Doyle become involved in the investigation of several mysterious deaths. They debate over whether the causes are natural or supernatural, and often bet on the cause, which causes their police liaison, Constable Adelaide Stratton, some embarrassment.

Cast

Main
 Michael Weston as Harry Houdini
 Stephen Mangan as Arthur Conan Doyle
 Rebecca Liddiard as Adelaide Stratton
 Adam Nagaitis as George Gudgett
 Tim McInnerny as Horace Merring

Recurring
 Emily Carey as Mary Conan Doyle
 Noah Jupe as Kingsley Conan Doyle
 Diana Quick as Cecelia Weiss

Guest
 Louise Delamere as Touie Doyle
 Laura Fraser as Lydia Belworth	
 Nathan Stewart-Jarrett as Elias Downey
 Blake Harrison as Lyman Biggs
 Edward Akrout as Henry
 Janine Duvitski as Martha
 James Fleet as Dr. Pilsen
 Ewen Bremner and Mark Caven as Sherlock Holmes
 Paul Ritter as Bram Stoker
 Owen Teale as Professor Havensling
 Peter Outerbridge as Thomas Edison
 Brandon Oakes as Walt

Production
The series was a treaty co-production between Big Talk Productions in the UK, and Shaftesbury Films in Canada, in association with Sony Pictures Television in the US, where executive producer David Shore's Shore Z Productions is based. It was filmed in two stages at The Space Project in Manchester with Liverpool Town Hall and Water Street being used for some of the exterior filming.

Broadcast
The series premiered on ITV and ITV Encore in the United Kingdom on the 13 March 2016. It premiered on the 2 May 2016, on Global in Canada and Fox in the United States. The series aired on RTÉ in the Republic of Ireland and Northern Ireland on the 18 May 2016  The series aired on Tokyo MX in  Tokyo, Japan on the 9 July 2019

Episodes

Reception

Ratings

See also

References

External links
 

2010s American crime drama television series
2010s British crime drama television series
2010s Canadian crime drama television series
2010s American police procedural television series
2010s British police procedural television series
2016 American television series debuts
2016 American television series endings
2016 British television series debuts
2016 British television series endings
2016 Canadian television series debuts
2016 Canadian television series endings
American action television series
American adventure television series
2010s American mystery television series
Cultural depictions of Arthur Conan Doyle
British action television series
British adventure television series
2010s British mystery television series
Canadian action television series
Canadian adventure television series
Canadian mystery television series
English-language television shows
Fox Broadcasting Company original programming
Cultural depictions of Harry Houdini
Television series by Corus Entertainment
Television series by Big Talk Productions
Television series by Shaftesbury Films
Television series by Sony Pictures Television
Television shows set in London
Television shows filmed in England
Biographical films about writers